Elmer Sutter Wilkens (June 26, 1901 – March 18, 1967) was an American football end in the National Football League. He played for the Green Bay Packers during the 1925 NFL season.

References

External links

Players of American football from Fort Wayne, Indiana
Green Bay Packers players
Indiana Hoosiers football players
1901 births
1967 deaths